John P. Dwan (May 3, 1921 – August 4, 1993) was an American professional basketball player.

A 6'4" (1.93 m) forward/guard from Loyola University Chicago, Dwan played two seasons (1947–49) in the National Basketball League and Basketball Association of America as a member of the Minneapolis Lakers. He won a NBL championship in 1948 and a BAA championship in 1949.

BAA career statistics

Regular season

Playoffs

References

External links
 

1921 births
1993 deaths
American men's basketball players
Basketball players from Chicago
Basketball players from Oklahoma
Loyola Ramblers men's basketball players
Minneapolis Lakers players
Professional Basketball League of America players
Shooting guards
Small forwards
Undrafted National Basketball Association players